"I'm a Freak" is the third English (and overall fifth) single from Enrique Iglesias's album, Sex and Love. It was the first single from the album to be released worldwide. The single was released on 11 January 2014 and features American rapper Pitbull.

The single was commercially successful and a hit in Europe. It became a top ten hit in the United Kingdom, Ireland, Scotland, Finland, Belgium (Flanders), Poland, Serbia, top twenty hit in Czech Republic, Russia, Spain and top forty hit in Bulgaria, and Austria.

Background 
The single was scheduled to be released in December 2012 but was postponed for unknown reasons. The track got leaked on the internet and social media on 31 December 2013.

This is the third single on which Iglesias and Pitbull have collaborated after the likes of "I Like It" and "I Like How It Feels". They have also collaborated on Pitbull's songs "Come 'n' Go" and "Tchu Tchu Tcha" off of his albums, Planet Pit (2011) and Global Warming (2012) respectively.

The cover of the single was uploaded on Iglesias's official website on 8 January 2014.

Composition 
"I'm a Freak" is a dance-pop and electro house song. It was written by Iglesias, Pitbull, Rome Ramirez and Niles Hollowell-Dhar. The song was produced by The Cataracs who also produced Iglesias's recent tracks "Turn the Night Up" and "Heart Attack".
Idolator described the single's music production as "Bouncy "electropop" and lyrics as "provocative". They stated that the song sounds more like something you’d hear during a particularly lively night out at a suburban P.F. Chang’s than it does like anything that captures an authentic piece of the Miami zeitgeist, it’ll probably be a crowd-pleaser.

Critical reception 

"I'm a Freak" generally received positive reviews. Jake Hamilton gave the song an A−, stating that the song is a chart conquer for spring. AMPed Music described the song as another club-ready anthem and a decent track. They also stated that the song "still oozes enough party mojo that would get any party animal crazy on the dance floor." ReDigi described it as "an unsurprisingly pure party anthem featuring a typically hedonistic production from The Cataracs ...Despite its wave of EDM bleeps, pulsing beats and suggestive lyrics, the song is a little more melodic and a little less bombastic than recent club bangers 'Turn The Night Up' and 'Finally Found You.'"

Haley Longman of OK! magazine gave a positive review and stated:Nothing will ever compare to the catchiness of “I Like It” probably, but Enrique and Pitbull’s newest collab comes pretty darn close. When Enrique says “cause I’m a freAKK” in the chorus and his voice goes up like that…can’t handle. This song is so good. And it’s probably the 2014 version of “Timber,” so…

However Direct Lyrics gave a negative review with 1.5/5 stars, stating that the song doesn't look too bright and that the lyrics of the song are decent but the beat is weak.

Chart performance 
"I'm a Freak" was commercially successful and a hit in Europe. It became a top 10 hit in the United Kingdom, Ireland, Scotland, Finland, Belgium (Flanders), Poland, Serbia, top 20 hit in Czech Republic, Russia, Spain and top 40 hit in Bulgaria, and Austria. The single made a debut at No. 40 on Billboard Dance/Electronic Songs.

Music video
The official music video premiered on 31 January 2014 on Iglesias' official Vevo account on YouTube. The music video is directed by Colin Tilley who has also directed Enrique's Heart Attack music video. The video has been viewed 80 million times (Aug 2017).

Track listing
Digital download
"I'm a Freak"  – 3:39

Other versions

 Dave Aude Party Vocal – 5:30
 Dave Aude Party Dub – 5:30
 Dave Aude Club Vocal – 5:26
 7th Heaven Club Mix – 7:04
 7th Heaven Radio Edit – 3:46

Live performances 
Iglesias was scheduled to perform the song at the Sports Illustrated Swimsuit event on 3 February 2014. He also performed the song at a private show on 14 January as well as in San Juan, Puerto Rico, and New York with Pitbull the day after.

He performed the song on The Voice UK on 29 March 2014. The song was also performed live on 21 June at Capital Summertime Ball 2014 at Wembley Stadium in London.

Charts

Weekly charts

Year-end charts

Certifications

References

Enrique Iglesias songs
Pitbull (rapper) songs
2014 singles
2014 songs
Song recordings produced by the Cataracs
Songs written by Enrique Iglesias
Universal Republic Records singles
Songs written by Marty James
Songs written by Dr. Luke
Songs written by Cirkut (record producer)
Song recordings produced by Cirkut (record producer)
Songs written by Rome Ramirez